Pierre-Philippe-André Levêque de Vilmorin (November 30, 1776 - March 21, 1862), more commonly known as Philippe André de Vilmorin, was a notable French horticulturist.

Vilmorin was the oldest son of Philippe-Victoire Levêque de Vilmorin (1746-1804), founder of a commercial agricultural establishment, studied at the college of Pont-le-Voy and subsequently Paris, and became the company's head upon his father's death. His travels to England in 1810, 1814, and 1816 allowed him to see first-hand the advances in English plant cultivation for horticulture and agriculture, and furthered his active interest in cereals, vegetables, forestry, and ornamental and exotic plants. The London Society of Horticulture presented him with its grand medal in 1814 for his numerous articles on these subjects.

In 1815 Vilmorin established Vilmorin-Andrieux et Cie, which ultimately became one of the world's largest suppliers of plants, and acquired a former hunting lodge of Louis XIV of France just outside Paris, which he developed into the Arboretum Vilmorin. In 1821 he purchased the Domaine des Barres (283 hectares), upon which he created an experimental forest, parts of which have now become the Arboretum national des Barres. Vilmorin died at Barres on March 21, 1862.

See also 
 Arboretum national des Barres
 Arboretum Vilmorin
 Arboretum de Pézanin
 Louis de Vilmorin (1816-1860)
 Joseph-Marie-Philippe Lévêque de Vilmorin (1872-1917)
 Louise Leveque de Vilmorin (1902-1969)

References 
 Gustave Heusé, Les Vilmorin (1746-1899): Philippe Victoire Levêque de Vilmorin (1746-1804); Pierre Philippe André Levêque de Vilmorin (1776-1862); Pierre Louis François Levêque de Vilmorin (1816-1860); Charles Philippe Henry Levêque de Vilmorin (1843-1899), Paris : Librairie agricole de la Maison rustique, 1899.
 Noel Kingsbury: Breeding a dynasty — The Vilmorin family In; Hybrid: The History and Science of Plant Breeding University of Chicago Press, 2009, 

French horticulturists
1776 births
1862 deaths
French foresters
Place of birth missing
19th-century agronomists
18th-century agronomists